Federation University Australia (Fed Uni) is a public, multi-sector university based in Ballarat in Victoria, Australia. The university also has campuses in Ararat, Horsham, Stawell, Churchill, Berwick, and Brisbane, as well as online technical and further education (TAFE) courses and Horsham's higher education nursing program.

Federation University is the fourth oldest tertiary education institution in Australia, having begun under predecessor institutions in 1870, during the Victorian gold rush. With the merger between the University of Ballarat and Monash University's Gippsland campus in 2013, the university changed its name to Federation University from 2014.

History

1870–2013

Tertiary education at Ballarat began in 1870, making it Australia's fourth oldest tertiary institution.

2014–present
On 6 September 2013, the Victorian Parliament passed legislation to establish Federation University Australia, The name change officially began in 2014. The then Vice-Chancellor justified the name change as an attempt to broaden the reach of the university nationally and internationally, and in fairness to the campuses outside Ballarat. The name was also the preferred name within the university, compared to 'State University of Victoria', 'Eureka University', 'Robert Menzies University' or 'Vida Goldstein University'.

Buildings and architecture
The former Ballarat Gaol, a maximum security prison that operated from 1862 until 1965, was located on the site of the university's School of Mines (SMB) campus, at the southern end of Lydiard Street. The area is known for being a well preserved Victorian era street. While the prison was mostly demolished in the 1960s, the old prison walls, gate and guard towers, as well as the residences of the governor and warden, still exist. One of the bedrooms was used by Bella Guerin, who in 1883 became the first woman to graduate from an Australian university. The campus also includes the old School of Mines buildings.

Academia

Undergraduate studies
Students can undertake undergraduate degrees across a wide range of study areas, which are:
 Humanities and social sciences
 Engineering
 Business
 Science and mathematics
 Education and early childhood
 Nursing, midwifery and paramedicine
 Psychology
 Performing arts
 Visual arts
 Information technology
 Occupational health and safety
 Sport, outdoor and physical education
 TAFE

Research

Researchers – academics and post-graduate students – undertake work within various centres, as well as within the disciplines. The research priority areas of the university are information forensics and security, transformative and preventative health, dynamic landscapes, history and heritage, and improving policy and practice in VET. The research centres are:
 Australian Retirement Research Institute (ARRI)
 Centre for Biopsychosocial and eHealth Research and Innovation (CBeRI)
 Centre for eResearch and Digital Innovation (CeRDI)
 Centre for Gippsland Studies (CGS)
 Centre for Informatics and Applied Optimisation (CIAO)
 Centre for Multimedia Computing, Communications, and Artificial Intelligence Research (MCCAIR)
 Geotechnical and Hydrogeological Engineering Research Group (GHERG)
 Researching Adult and Vocational Education (RAVE)
 Water Research Network
 Visiting Friends and Relatives Research
There are also research facilities at Ballarat Technology Park, the Gippsland Enterprise Centre and Nanya Station in rural NSW.

Rankings 

In 2017, FedUni was ranked within the top 20% of Australian universities in humanities for teaching quality, learner engagement, learning resources, skills development, and student support. Nationally, the university is ranked 31 in Australia (out of 40) and 1526 in the world. Across the university, for postgraduate research the university is rated above the national average by former students with 78.8% satisfaction. For undergraduate studies, the university is rated above national average by former students with 83.3% satisfaction.

Historically, the former University of Ballarat achieved a maximum five-star rating for teaching quality in the Good Universities Guide consecutively from 2010 to 2014. Federation University has been ranked four-stars for graduate placement by the Good Universities Guide, but is not ranked in international university guides. This placed the university in the top tier of Australian regional universities.

Student demographics and engagement
In 2017, 80% of undergraduate students study full-time and on campus, which is unique for a regional university, and 35% of students are international students.

Facilities

Campuses
In addition to the following campuses, the university also had joint-degree programmes with international colleges, including PLK Vicwood KT Chong Sixth Form College in Hong Kong.

Ballarat

Camp Street Campus – located in central Ballarat, this campus houses the Arts Academy. The campus consists of the Old General Post Office Building, the Old Courthouse, and several newer buildings which were completed in 2002.
SMB Campus – located in central Ballarat and incorporates the original School of Mines Ballarat and the Old Ballarat Gaol. The campus offers training from certificate level through to advanced diploma and degree-level study.

Western Victorian campuses

Wimmera Campus – offers TAFE courses and a higher education course in nursing.

Mt Helen Campus
Located in Mt Helen, 10 km south of Ballarat. The university's largest campus, it has three residences, Peter Lalor South Hall, Peter Lalor North Hall, and Bella Guerin Hall. Its programs include the Institute of Education, Arts and Community; Institute of Health and Wellbeing: Institute of Innovation, Science and Sustainability.

Gippsland Campus
The Gippsland Campus is located in the township of Churchill in the foothills of the Strzelecki Ranges. The campus is home to over 2,500 students and approximately 400 staff.

The campus was formerly Monash University, Gippsland Campus, but became part of Federation University Australia on 1 January 2014.

Berwick Campus
It was transitioning itself from the Monash University, Berwick campus in 2017 and completed its transition in early 2018. The exact location of the building is 100 Clyde Road Berwick VIC 3806. The university has four buildings naming 901, 902, 903, and 930 as well as additional buildings for on-campus living. Nursing has the highest enrolment rate at the Berwick Campus, with a focus also on education courses, IT, and psychology.

Brisbane Campus
The Brisbane Campus, situated in the centre of Brisbane city and offers a range of undergraduate and postgraduate programs in information technology, business and allied health.

Technology park
The university has a technology park with the mission to facilitate the development of technology-based companies or companies that benefit from the technological resources of the university. The following organisations operate in the park.

 Ambulance Victoria
 Country Fire Authority
 Emergency Services Telecommunications Authority (ESTA)
 Global Innovation Centre
 Greenhill Enterprise Centre
 IBM South East Asia
 IBM Regional Software Solutions Centre 
 ID Research 
 State Revenue Office

More than 1350 people are employed by tenants at the technology park and approximately half of those holding Federation University Australia qualifications. Recently IBM decided to expand its workforce with the construction of a new $10 million building on the park.

Research institutes and centres
Centre for eResearch and Digital Innovation
Health Innovation and Transformation Centre
Future Regions Research Centre
Centre for Smart Analytics
Centre for New Energy Transition Research
Collaborative Evaluation and Research Group
Geotechnical and Hydrogeological Engineering Research Group

Notable alumni 

 Kate Allen (triathlete)
 Martin Andanar, press secretary of the Philippines under Duterte administration
 Aunty Donna, absurdist sketch comedy troupe 
 William Baragwanath, geologist
 Phillip Bellingham, winter olympian
 Steve Bracks, former Premier of Victoria
 Sandy Blythe, wheelchair basketball player
 Dr Cyril P. Callister, inventor of Vegemite
 Darren Cheeseman, politician
 Peter Crisp, politician
 Jacqueline Dark, opera singer
 David Davies (artist)
 Jack Gervasoni, Australian Rules footballer
 Keith Hamilton, former Minister for Agriculture and former Minister for Aboriginal Affairs
 Ben Hardman, politician
 Will Longstaff, artist
 Brad McEwan, Ten Network sports reporter
 Kiran Mazumdar-Shaw, businesswoman and associate of Biocon
 Steve Moneghetti, Olympic marathon runner
 Richard W Richards, physicist and Antarctic explorer
 Henry Sutton, inventor
 Libby Tanner, actress
 Wes Walters, artist
 Marcus Wills, artist

See also

List of universities in Australia

Notes

References

External links 
 Federation University Australia – official website

 
Australian vocational education and training providers
Universities in Victoria (Australia)
Ballarat
Educational institutions established in 2013
2013 establishments in Australia